Metronome is an artists' and writers' organ founded in 1996 by Clémentine Deliss.

It acts as alternative art publishing, because it has not a fixed editorial team and a fixed location. Its activity started with the publication of a sort of a magazine and in 2005 Deliss decided to build also an experimental publishing house called Metronome Press.

Metronome is a non-profit organisation, it is first of all an organ and a research methodology where artists, writers and curators collaborate to produce printed projects. 
Its first attempt is to work with fiction, mixing art and literature. For this reason professionals of aesthetic practice, such as the artist, the critic or the writer, overlap and change their role.

Fiction is a central component to all editions of Metronome, and in particular the latest productions with Metronome Press.

The artwork 
Metronome is more often compared to an artwork than a publication because it is both a collective artwork and a research methodology. Furthermore, it cannot be considered an art magazine as such because it includes texts of fiction rather than criticism or theoretical texts written by art critics.
 
As a critical alternative to conventional art publishing, Metronome generates new works by artists and writers with the intention of creating new circuits of art scenes in different locations. It aims to create a neighbourhood between artists and writers of all over the world, stimulating a discussion on the art backstage that cannot take place in the public space as an exhibition. For this reason it is conceived as a creative tangent to an exhibition and an instrument for research.

(Ursula Biemann, artist and curator)

Each issue is the result of a research made in a number of different cities and locations of the world including Dakar, London, Berlin, Copenhagen, Oslo, Basel, Frankfurt, Vienna and others.

Every time the editor Clémentine Deliss creates a group of new collaborators related to the place.

"Metronome is an interpretational tool rather than a vehicle for the promotion of artists' works" (Clémentine Deliss)

Recent issues have been linked to "Future Academy", a research initiative that has been active since 2002 in the UK, Senegal, India, US, Australia, and Japan, and is currently based at Edinburgh College of Art.

Issues

Metronome No. 0 - Pilot Issue. Dakar, 1996   
This is a pilot issue of Metronome printed in Senegal that set the production of all future issues.

It includes interviews with Catherine David and Paul Virilio, visual and text-based conversations between Dakar and London.

Artists & Writers: Autograph; Joshua Compston; Catherine David; Clémentine Deliss; Joy Gregory; Elizabeth Harney; Laboratoire Agit'Art; Rut Blees Luxemburg; Issa Samb; Penny Siopis; Djibril Sy; El Sy; Paul Virilio.

Metronome No. 1 - London, 1997 
Artists & Writers: Bili Bidjocka; Rut Blees Luxemburg; Guy Brett; Ery Camara; Andrew Cross; Clémentine Deliss; Tracey Emin; Carl Freedman; Tom Gidley; Edouard Glissant; Susan Hiller; Gary Hume; Jaki Irvine; Greg James; Atta Kwami; Zoe Leonard; Langlands & Bell; Fred Mann; Cathy de Monchaux; Michelle Naismith; Alistair Raphael; Issa Samb; Djibril Sy; Mark Aerial Waller.

Metronome No. 2 - Berlin, 1997 
Published in August 1997, for documenta X.

Artists & Writers: Franz Ackermann; Gamal Al-Ghitani; Andrea & Philippe; May Ayim; Sabeth Buchmann; Matthew Collings; Clémentine Deliss; Nina Fischer & Maroan El Sani; Durs Grünbein; Abdoulaye Guissé; Judith Hopf; Rebecca Horn; Johannes Kahrs; Ulrike Kuschel; Via Lewandowsky; Rémy Markowitsch; Carsten Nicolai; Olaf Nicolai; Mohamed Magani; Jakob Mattner; Wairimu Mwangi Thamaini; Frank Thiel; Anatoli Shuravlev; Julian Stallabrass; Annelies Strba; Mamadou Touré dit Béhan; Gavin Turk; Emmett Williams; Slavoj Zizek.

Metronome No. 3 - Basel, 1998 
Tempolabor, A libertine Laboratory ?

Artists & Writers: Rasna Bhushan; Ursula Biemann; Peter Brandlmayr; Clémentine Deliss; Marianne Eigenheer; Charles Esche; Ewa Esterhazy; Jean-Paul Felley; Izeta Gradevic; Eric Hattan; Rummana Hussain; Olivier Kaeser; Birgit Kempker; Jörg Lenzlinger; Renée Levi; Via Lewandowsky; Heinrich Lüber; Muda Mathis; Claudia & Julia Müller; Marianne Müller; Tim Neuger; Olaf Nicolai; Peter Pakesch; Dan Peterman; Maria & Michelangelo Pistoletto; Stephan Prina; Martin Prinzhorn; Progetto Arte; Tobias Rehberger; Leila Sadeghee; Issa Samb; Nicolaus Schafhausen; Andrew Shields; Kan-Si; Martina Siegwolf; Gerda Steiner; Reinhard Storz; Peter Suter; Wawrzyniec Tokarski; Annette Ungar; Cyril Verrier; Nebojsa Vilic; Sus Zwick.

Metronome No. 4-5-6 - Edinburgh, Bordeaux, Frankfurt, Vienna, Biella, 1999 

Backwards Translation

Artists & Writers: Unai Goieaskoetxea Arronategi; Axford, Dale, Löwenstein & Young; Miriam Bajtala; Yassine Balbzioui; Thomas Baumann; Thomas Bayrle; Stefan Beck; Lutz Braun; Ernst Caramelle; Hsia-Fei Chang; Sunah Choi; Arnaud Dejeammes; Clémentine Deliss; Jean-:Luc Desmond; P.K. Dick; John Douglas; Irene Düring; Steve Duval; Gardar Eide Einarsson; Ewa Einhorn; Charles Esche; Andreas Exner; Roman Fehr; Dirk Fleischmann; Parastou Forouhar; Sophie Fougy; Luca Frei; Hamish Fulton; Gerhard Geiger; Yann Géraud; Simon Girault; Marcus Graf & A.T. Kelemen; Tamara Grcic; Gerald Gerstenberger; Fritz Grohs; Steffi Hartel; Kathrin Höhne; Laura Horelli; Sergei Jensen; Alan Johnston; Franz Kapfer; Anne Kaminsky; Kan-Si; Phyllis Kiehl; Udo Koch; Peter Kogler; Kasper König; Timo Kopomaa; Suwan Laimanee; Elanit Leder; Marko Lehanka; Achim Lengerer; Kerstin Lichtblau; Karen Loughridge; Lyn Löwenstein; Fiona Macalister; Jan Machacek & Radostina Patulova; Pierre Molinier; Joshua Moon; Claudia & Julia Müller; Olaf Nicolai; Angelika Nollert; Christos Papoulias; Andrew Patrizio; Edith Payer; Manfred Peckl; Michael Pfrommer; Kiersten Pieroth; Lisa Pock; Stephan Potengowski; Alan Rankin; Anna Ray; Tobias Rehberger; Mandla Reuter; Michael S. Riedel; Tanja Ristovski; Monika Ruckstuhl; Nicole Schatt; Eva Schlegel; Christian C. Schweitzer; Thomas Seidemann; Anya Sheade; Constant Siméon-Reinhard; Sean Snyder; Andreas Spiegl; Wolfgang Stengel; Misha Stroj; Superflex; Markus Szikszay; Jean-Paul Thibeau; Armin B. Wagner; Mark Aerial Waller; Naomi West; Alexander Wolff; Ekrem Yalcindag; Haegue Yang.

Metronome No. 7 - Oslo, Copenhagen, Stockholm, Bergen, Malmö, 2001 
The Bastard

Designed by Liam Gillick

Artists & Writers: Norris Adoro; Kristoffer Akselbo; Guy Bar Amotz; Anonymous; Theodor Barth; Rikke Benborg; Johannes Bergmark; Bili Bidjocka; Greta Blok; Ina Blom; Karlotta Blöndal; Kaspar Bonnén; Liv Bugge; Maria Candéa; Benson Chiremba; Jacques Demarcq; Alexander García Düttmann; Ewa Einhorn; Annika Eriksson; Alma Erlich; Unn Fahlstrøm; Jo Torkjel Fenne; Luca Frei; William Furlong; Kendell Geers; Liam Gillick; Pierre Giquel; Raymond Hains; Lise Harlev; Molly Haslund; Gad Hollander; Saskia Holmkvist; Karl Holmqvist; Leif Holmstrand; Jun Iseyama; Frans Jacobi; Alan Johnston; Phyllis Kiehl; Björn Kjelltoft; Ferdinand Ahm Krag; Cees Krijnen; Pierre Leguillon; Oskar Lindvall; Håkon Liu; a Love Laboratory; Ingrid Luche; Bernard Marcadé; Bjarne Melgaard; Mary-Annick Morel; Simon Njami; Douglas Park; Rabia; Hans Hamid Rasmussen; Øyvind Renberg; Emil Røyrvik; Joanna Rytel; Thomas Saenger; Issa Samb; ManfreDu Schu; Åsa Sonjasdotter; Misha Stroj; Hiroshi Sunairi; Adam Szymczyk; Samon Takahashi; Jean-Paul Thibeau; Johan Tirén; Linn Cecilie Ulvin; Salomé Voegelin; Haegue Yang.

Metronome No. 8A & 8B - London, 2002 
The Stunt & The Queel

Artists & Writers contributors: Michael Archer; Dave Beech; Rut Blees Luxemburg; Colin Cina; Neil Cummings; R. Nick Evans; Rose Finn-Kelcey; Ben Fitton; Anna Fasshauer; Kendell Geers; Babak Ghazi; Liam Gillick; Felicity Greenland; Alan Johnston; Annis Joslin; Stephen Klee; Langlands and Bell; John Latham; Douglas Park; Barbara Steveni; Gavin Turk; Hans Weigand; Cerith Wyn Evans.

Metronome No. 9 - Paris, 2005 
Le Teaser & Le Joker

Artists & Writers contributors: John Akomfrah & Edward George, Marc Atlas, Olivier Babin, Paul Baruch, Diamantis, Ewa Einhorn, Charles Henri Ford & Parker Tyler, Craig Garrett, Tom Gidley, Claire Guezengar, Judith Ickowicz, Phyllis Kiehl, Lefevre Jean Claude, Susannah Mabitt, Rev. Boyd MacDonald, Tom McCarthy, Bill Moan, Douglas Park, Abo Rasul, Nancy Strasbourg, Samon Takahashi, Boris Tiago, Oscar Tuazon, Bella Woodfield.

Metronome No.10 - Oregon, 2006 
Future Academy.  Shared, Mobile, Improvised, Underground, Hidden, Floating

Special edition for documenta 12 magazines

Artists & Writers contributors: Ibon Aranberri, Nico Dockx, Didier Fiuza Faustino, Richard Fischbeck, Yona Friedman, Jan Mast, Christos Papoulias, Douglas Park, Michelangelo Pistoletto, Matthew Stadler, and members of Future Academy in Edinburgh, Bangalore, and Dakar.

Metronome No. 11 - Tokyo, 2007 
What is to be done? Tokyo

Artists & Writers contributors: Future Academy; Arts Initiative Tokyo; co-lab; Magnus Bärtås; Thomas Boutoux; Nico Dockx; Hu Fan; Boris Gobille; Yuko Hasegawa; Alan Johnston; Mami Kataoka; Roger McDonald; Masato Nakamura; Fumio Nanjo; Aomi Okabe; Tetsuya Ozaki; Yuko Ozawa; Christos Papoulias; Johannes Raether; Georg Schöllhammer; Stephanie Snyder; Matthew Stadler; Oscar Tuazon; Masahiro Wada; Takayuki Yamamoto and many others.

Metronome Press 
Metronome Press is a not-for-profit collective run by Clémentine Deliss and Thomas Boutoux in Paris. It was founded in 2005 and it has to be considered as an extension of the research of Metronome No.9, based on the international history of avant-garde publishing in Paris and its productive intersection between art and literature.
 
It started from the brilliant intuition of Maurice Girodias, the founder of The Olympia Press, to highlight the cultural internationalism of Paris and turn it into a centre for global arts distribution. For this reason all the books are published in English.

Metronome Press has published four novels in the shape of a new paperback series, three by living visual artists and one reprint from the 1930s, the cult camp diatribe of Charles Henri Ford and Parker Tyler, "The Young and Evil".

By stressing anonymity, false names and short extracts of novels that may or may not be published, it underlines the desire to produce works that enable artists and writers to step out of the norm and to test out different ways of representing their ideas.

Metronome Press is not conceived as a commercial art press, but both artists and the publisher are involved in the production and distribution of the books.

The first collection of paperbacks
Fat Mountain Scenes by Phyllis Kiehl
Stunning Lofts by Tom Gidley
Remainder by Tom McCarthy
The Young and Evil by Charles Henri Ford and Parker Tyler

Office For First Intentions 
Since May 2006, Metronome Press has extended its activities from a publishing house to an Office For First Intentions.

Conceived on the model of a halfway house or maison de passe, it functions as an intermediary space between the private environment of the studio or office and the public site of the museum, gallery, or cinema. The Office For First Intentions proposes a number of initiatives, built by artists, sociologists, film-makers, architects, critics, and curators who aspire to an economy of production outside of the normal institution. 
The Office For First Intentions promotes a common space based upon elective affinities and unexpected encounters. It is currently organising a series of dialogues between artists and researchers during sessions, where an artist or researcher is invited to present a new work that is still in the making.

Deliss, Boutoux and the sociologist and writer Boris Gobille are the members involved in the sessions. However, this membership can expand in order to achieve the necessary conditions for the analysis of a specific first intention and to encourage multiple perspectives.

External links
Official site
Interview with publisher Clémentine Deliss
Future Academy's voiceforum
Documenta Magazines_Metronome
documenta 12 magazines

Alternative magazines
Literary magazines published in France
Magazines established in 1996